Dr. Kalpana Saini  (born 1 October 1959) is an Indian politician belonging to the Bharatiya Janata Party (BJP) who currently serves as Member of parliament Rajya Sabha. She previously served as Chaiperson of Backward Commission of Uttarakhand Government.  Director of National fertiliser Limited  and District President of Roorkee  (Uttarakhand), before that State Secretary of the state of Uttarakhand, State President of Uttarakhand Pradhanacharya Parishad from 2003 to 2005. She has also served as the General Secretary of Durga Vahini, Roorkee Uttarakhand and President of Sewa bharti Matri Mandal, Roorkee and Councilor of the BJP, 1995–2000. She holds many senior position at BJP, VHP and Yogi Mangalnath Saraswati Shishu mandir. She began her career as a lecturer and served as Principal at Gandhi mahila shilp Vidyalaya from 1987 and used her long-term connections with the Hindutva organization, Rashtriya Swayamsevak Sangh to become involved with the Bharatiya Janata Party. On May 29/2022 The Bhartiya Janata Party named Kalpana Saini as its nominee for the Rajya Sabha (RS) seat from Uttarakhand.She became the 2nd woman from hill state to represent Uttrakhand in Rajyasabha.

Early life 
Kalpana was born in the small village of (Shivdaspur- teliwala) Roorkee in Haridwar District of the Indian state of Uttar Pradesh in a Saini family. Her father was Prithvi Singh Viksit and her mother Kamala Devi. She was born into a family of farmers and went on to secure a PhD degree in Sanskrit, acquiring first division results from the Meerut University.  Kalpana Saini had been associated with the Rashtriya Swayamsevak Sangh since 1990, at the age of 31 and remained connected with the organization even during her employment as a principal in Roorkee. In 1995, she was appointed councilor for the Roorkee of Bharatiya Janata Party. She is one of the most powerful and influential BJP leaders in Uttarakhand.

References 

Women in Uttarakhand politics
Bharatiya Janata Party politicians from Uttarakhand
Rashtra Sevika Samiti members
Rashtriya Swayamsevak Sangh pracharaks
People from Haridwar district
21st-century Indian women politicians
21st-century Indian politicians
1959 births
Living people
Women members of the Rajya Sabha
Rajya Sabha members from Uttarakhand